Caio César Franco da Silveira, commonly known as Caio Silveira (born 3 May 1966) is a Brazilian former professional basketball player.

National team career
With the senior Brazilian national basketball team, da Silveira competed at the 1996 Summer Olympics.

References

External links
 

1966 births
Living people
Brazilian men's basketball players
Olympic basketball players of Brazil
Basketball players at the 1996 Summer Olympics
Basketball players from São Paulo
People from Leme, São Paulo